Brandlingill is a village in Cumbria, England.

Villages in Cumbria
Allerdale